Alice's Restaurant: The Massacree Revisited is a 1997 album by American folk singer Arlo Guthrie. The album is a new recording of all material from the entire original Alice's Restaurant album, as performed live 29 years later at The Church in Housatonic, Massachusetts. The cover of this release also pays homage to its predecessor as it pictures Guthrie in the same pose as the original album: sitting shirtless at a dinner table with a napkin spread over his chest, holding his fork and knife and waiting for Thanksgiving dinner to begin. This time he is without his hat (displaying a full head of gray hair) and 29 years older.

Each song is essentially faithful to the original, with one notable exception. At the end of the re-recording of "Alice's Restaurant Massacree", Guthrie launches into a postscript story about attending Jimmy Carter's inauguration in 1977. He meets Carter's son Chip, who tells him of the discovery of an opened copy of Alice's Restaurant left behind by the Nixon family when they left the White House, leading to speculation around the fact that the title song and the gap in the Watergate tapes are both 18½ minutes in length. The Massacree Revisited continued a tradition of Guthrie's to perform "Alice's Restaurant Massacree" only once every 10 years, with this version coinciding with the 30th anniversary of the song.

Track listing
All tracks composed by Arlo Guthrie.

"Alice's Restaurant Massacree (The Massacree Revisited)" – 22:26
"Chilling of the Evening" – 3:52
"Ring-Around-a-Rosy Rag" – 2:36
"Now and Then" – 2:22
"I'm Going Home" – 3:50
"The Motorcycle Song" – 2:53
"Highway in the Wind" – 4:14

Personnel
Arlo Guthrie – vocals, keyboards
Terry A La Berry – drums
David Grover – guitar
Sean Hurley – bass guitar
Steve Ide – guitar

References

Arlo Guthrie live albums
1996 live albums
Rising Son Records live albums